Stan Johnson is a Liberian-born basketball coach and former player who is the current head coach of the Loyola Marymount Lions men's basketball team.

Playing career
Johnson played three seasons at Southern Utah where he was a team captain and part of the Thunderbirds' 2001 NCAA tournament squad which was narrowly defeated 68–65 by third-seeded Boston College in the program's only NCAA Tournament appearance. For his senior season, Johnson transferred to Bemidji State and was the team's leader in assists and an all-conference honorable mention.

Coaching career
Johnson would stay on Bemidji State's bench following his senior year as a one-year stop as an assistant coach before moving on to Southwest Baptist as an assistant from 2004 to 2007, where he was part of a Bearcats MAIAA team which made the NCAA Division II Tournament. After a one-year stop at Cal State Northridge where he tied for first in the Big West Conference , Johnson would join Jim Boylen's staff at Utah. In 2008–09, the Utes won a share of the Mountain West Conference Championship and the postseason conference tournament title. Utah finished the season ranked No. 25 in the AP poll and earned a No. 5 seed in the Midwest Region, at the time the highest seed ever given to a Mountain West team. He landed at Drake for an assistant coaching spell from 2011 to 2013 before joining Herb Sendek's staff at Arizona State, where he remained until 2015, helping guide the Sun Devils to an NCAA Tournament appearance in 2014. In 2015, Johnson joined Steve Wojciechowski's staff at Marquette, and was a part of two Golden Eagles NCAA tournament teams. Johnson was responsible for recruiting Markus Howard to Arizona State and, ultimately, Marquette where Howard became a consensus First Team All-American selection as a senior.

On March 20, 2020, Johnson was named the head coach at Loyola Marymount, replacing Mike Dunlap.

Head coaching record

References

Living people
American men's basketball coaches
Basketball coaches from Utah
Loyola Marymount Lions men's basketball coaches
Marquette Golden Eagles men's basketball coaches
Arizona State Sun Devils men's basketball coaches
Drake Bulldogs men's basketball coaches
Utah Utes men's basketball coaches
Cal State Northridge Matadors men's basketball coaches
Southwest Baptist Bearcats men's basketball coaches
Bemidji State Beavers men's basketball coaches
Southern Utah Thunderbirds men's basketball players
Bemidji State Beavers men's basketball players
Basketball players from Salt Lake City
Sportspeople from Salt Lake City
Year of birth missing (living people)